Surinder Kapoor (23 December 1925 – 24 September 2011) was an Indian film producer. He produced Bollywood films and also served as President of the Film & Television Producers Guild of India from 1995 to 2001.  He was born in Peshawar, British India (in present-day Pakistan). Surinder Kapoor belonged to a Punjabi Hindu family from Peshawar. He is a distant relative of the Kapoor family.

Prithviraj Kapoor, his cousin, is the one who invited him to Bombay to join the Hindi Film Industry. He started his film career as a secretary to Hindi film star of the 1950s Geeta Bali. The Dada Saheb Phalke Academy honoured him with the Shri L V Prasad Phalke award in 2009. When asked in an interview, how he established S.K.International Films, he quoted in an interview "Rajesh Khanna who played the title-role in Shehzada was truly of a princely disposition. He started shooting for me without ever discussing the price, saying that we could settle that once the film is made, he said and made banner S. K. International Films became an acknowledged company." His first successful film in Hindi as a producer was Shehzada directed by K. Shankar which was a remake of Tamil film Idhu Sathiyam (1963). However, Surinder's subsequent release Phool Khile Hain Gulshan Gulshan (film) and Bikash Rao were flops, due to which he went into huge debts. Later as a producer in the 1980s he made good money with his productions, which were remakes of Kannada, Tamil or Telugu films like Hum Paanch, Woh Saat Din, Loafer, Judaai, Sirf Tum, Hamara Dil Aapke Paas Hai, Pukar, No Entry - all of them starring his son Anil Kapoor in the lead. His younger son, Sanjay Kapoor was lead actor in Sirf Tum.

He died after suffering a cardiac arrest on 24 September 2011.

His three sons, Boney, Anil and Sanjay, are also involved in the film industry. Anil Kapoor is a successful Bollywood actor. His daughter-in-law Sridevi married to his eldest son Boney was a famous Bollywood actress. His daughter, Reena, is married to Sandeep Marwah of Marwah Films and Video Studios. Boney is a well known and a famous Producer and Sanjay acted in several movies.

Filmography
Milenge Milenge (2010), producer
No Entry (2005), producer
Hamara Dil Aapke Paas Hai (2000), producer
Pukar (2000), producer
Sirf Tum (1999), producer
Judaai (1997), producer
Loafer (1996), producer
Woh Saat Din (1983), producer
Hum Paanch (1980), producer
Phool Khile Hain Gulshan Gulshan (1978), producer
Ponga Pandit (1975), Producer utv
Bikash Rao
Shehzada (1972)
Ek Shrimaan Ek Shrimati (1969), producer
Jab Se Tumhe Dekha Hai (1963), producer
Tarzan Comes to Delhi (1965), producer
Farishta (1958 film) producer

References

External links

The Film & Television Producers Guild of India
Presidents of the Film & Television Producers Guild of India
India Times

1925 births
2011 deaths
Hindi film producers
People from Peshawar
Producers who won the Best Film on National Integration National Film Award